Vasile Rădulescu (2 January 1945 – 31 May 2022) was a Romanian politician who served as a Deputy.

References

1945 births
2022 deaths
20th-century Romanian politicians
Members of the Chamber of Deputies (Romania)
National Salvation Front (Romania) politicians
People from Vrancea County